Snapshot is the debut studio album by Irish rock band The Strypes, released on 9 September 2013. The album was produced by highly acclaimed record producer Chris Thomas at Yellow Fish Studios, England. The title of the album derives from the band's intention while recording the album to create a "snapshot" of their live set that got them noticed in the first place.

The album contains singles "Blue Collar Jane", "Hometown Girls", "What a Shame", "Mystery Man" and "You Can't Judge a Book by the Cover".

Critical reception

The album has received positive to mixed reviews. The Independent raved the album as "a scintillating shot of roughneck rhythm and blues," by giving it a 4/5 star review. Simon Harper of Clash Magazine said that "with such infectious energy and lyrics capturing the timeless topics of youth, really: what's not to like? Harmonica sales will soar". Mojo also gave the album a rave review, stating that "It's nigh on impossible not to succumb to the band's hurtling energy and panache" and that "only a corpse wouldn't holler 'go, cats, go!'"

Track listing
All tracks composed and written by The Strypes, except where noted.

Personnel
 Ross Farrelly - lead vocals, harmonica, percussion, guitar on "What a Shame" and "Angel Eyes"
 Josh McClorey - lead guitar, vocals on "Perfect Storm" and "She's So Fine"
 Pete O'Hanlon - bass guitar, harmonica on "Blue Collar Jane" & "Rollin' & Tumblin'", keyboards on "What a Shame"
 Evan Walsh - drums, percussion, keyboards on "What a Shame"

Charts

Weekly charts

Year-end charts

References

2013 debut albums
The Strypes albums
Virgin EMI Records albums
Albums produced by Chris Thomas (record producer)